The  Washington Redskins season was the franchise's 43rd season in the National Football League (NFL) and their 38th in Washington, D.C. The team matched on their 10–4 record from 1973. It is also notable for being Deacon Jones' first and only season with the Redskins; as well as being his final year in the NFL.

Offseason

NFL Draft

Roster

Pre season

Schedule

Pre season Game summaries

Week P1 (Friday, August 2, 1974): vs. New England Patriots

 Time of Game: 2 hours, 41 minutes

Week P2 (Friday, August 9, 1974): vs. Houston Oilers

 Time of Game:

Week P3 (Sunday, August 18, 1974): vs. Buffalo Bills

 Time of Game:

Week P4 (Saturday, August 24, 1974): at Cleveland Browns

 Time of Game:

Week P5 (Friday, August 30, 1974): vs. Pittsburgh Steelers

 Time of Game:

Week P6 (Friday, September 6, 1974): vs. Baltimore Colts

 Time of Game:

Regular season

Schedule

Standings

Regular Season Game summaries

Week 1 (Sunday, September 15, 1974): at New York Giants

Point spread: Redskins –7
 Time of Game:

Week 2 (Sunday, September 22, 1974): vs. St. Louis Cardinals

Point spread: Redskins –9
 Time of Game:

Week 3 (Monday, September 30, 1974): vs. Denver Broncos

Point spread: Redskins –3
 Time of Game: 2 hours, 48 minutes

Week 4 (Sunday, October 6, 1974): at Cincinnati Bengals

Point spread: Redskins +4½
 Time of Game:

Week 5 (Sunday, October 13, 1974): vs. Miami Dolphins

Point spread: Redskins +5
 Time of Game: 2 hours, 40 minutes

Week 6 (Sunday, October 20, 1974): vs. New York Giants

Point spread: Redskins –13½
 Time of Game:

Week 7 (Sunday, October 27, 1974): at St. Louis Cardinals

Point spread: Redskins Pick'em
 Time of Game:

Week 8 (Sunday, November 3, 1974): at Green Bay Packers

Point spread: Redskins –3
 Time of Game:

Week 9 (Sunday, November 10, 1974): at Philadelphia Eagles

Point spread: Redskins –6½
 Time of Game:

Week 10 (Sunday, November 17, 1974): vs. Dallas Cowboys

Point spread: Redskins –1½
 Time of Game:

Week 11 (Sunday, November 24, 1974): vs. Philadelphia Eagles

Point spread: Redskins –10
 Time of Game:

Week 12 (Thursday, November 28, 1974): at Dallas Cowboys

Point spread: Redskins Pick'em
 Time of Game: 

Thanksgiving Day

Diron Talbert knocked Roger Staubach out of the game.

Week 13 (Monday, December 9, 1974): at Los Angeles Rams

Point spread: 
 Time of Game:

Week 14 (Sunday, December 15, 1974): vs. Chicago Bears

Point spread: 
 Time of Game:

Stats

Passing

Rushing

Receiving

Kicking

Punting

Kick Return

Punt Return

Sacks

Interceptions

Fumbles

Tackles

Scoring Summary

Team

Quarter-by-quarter

Playoffs

Playoff Game Officials

NFC Divisional Playoffs (Sunday, December 22, 1974): at Los Angeles Rams

Point spread: 
 Time of Game:

Awards, records, and honors

References

Washington
Washington Redskins seasons
Washington Redskins